= Subba Rao Jasti =

Indian businessman

- Born: Subba Rao Jasti; 1926 or 1927 (age 98–99)
- Occupation: Investor

Subba Rao Jasti (born 1926/1927) is an Indian businessman and billionaire who was an early investor in pharmaceutical manufacturer Suven founded by his son Venkateswarlu Jasti in 1989. Suven went public in 1995. In 2020, Suven was demerged into Suven Pharmaceuticals, which focuses on contract research, and Suven Life Sciences, which focuses on neuroscience therapies.

He is married and lives in Hyderabad, India.

Forbes lists his net worth as of April 2022 at US$1.1 billion.
